Carpenter's mate (CM) was a United States Navy rating throughout the 19th century and the first half of the 20th century.

The rating was established in 1797, and separate pay grades were implemented in 1893. The sleeve insignia for the rating depicted two crossed axes. Responsibilities of carpenter's mates included maintaining ship ventilation, watertight control, painting, and drainage. During the era of wooden ships, carpenter's mates were charged with maintaining the integrity of the ship's hull. In times of battle, carpenter's mates would fight fires and use plugs to patch holes in the hull. In 1948, the rating was changed to damage controlman.

References 

United States Navy ratings